Janszoon usually abbreviated to Jansz was a Dutch patronym ("son of Jan"). While Janse, Janssens, and especially Jansen and Janssen, are very common surnames derived from this patronym, the form Jansz is quite rare  and Janszoon itself does not exist in the Netherlands. 
People with this name or its variants include:

As a surname
Ernst Jansz (born 1948), Dutch musician and novelist, founding member of Doe Maar
Frederica Jansz, Sri Lankan Burgher journalist, Editor of the Sunday Leader
Geoff Jansz (born 1958), Sri Lankan Australian Burgher chef and television presenter
Herbert Eric Jansz (1890-1976), Sri Lankan Burgher civil servant
Neville Jansz, Sri Lankan Burgher civil servant and diplomat
Pieter Jansz (1820–1904), Dutch Mennonite missionary in Indonesia

In lieu of a surname
Jan Janssonius (1588–1664), also known as Jan Janszoon, Dutch cartographer 
Jan Janszoon (1570–1641), first President and Grand Admiral of the Corsair Republic of Salè, Governor of Oualidia, and a Dutch pirate
Willem Janszoon (1570–1630), Dutch navigator and colonial governor, is the first European known to have seen the coast of Australia

As a patronym

Since "Jan" was the most common given name in the Netherlands for many centuries, the patronym was exceedingly common. To name a few:
Aart Jansz Druyvesteyn (1577–1627), Dutch painter
Aert Jansz Marienhof (1626–1652), Dutch painter
Adriaen Jansz Kraen (1619–1679), Dutch painter
Albert Jansz. Klomp (1625–1688), Dutch painter
Albert Jansz Vinckenbrinck (1604–1665), Dutch sculptor
Anthonie Jansz. van der Croos (1606–1662), Dutch painter
Anthony Janszoon van Salee (1607–1676), original settler of and prominent, wealthy landholder, merchant, and creditor in New Netherland
Christiaen Jansz van Bieselingen (1558–1600), Dutch painter. 
Claes Jansz. Visscher, (1587–1652), Flemish draughtsman, engraver, printmaker and publisher
Diederik Jansz. Graeff, (1532–1589), first illustrious member of the De Graeff family, a rich merchant, Ship-owner and Politician
Dirk Jansz Smient, governor of Mauritius in the new settlement at Grand Port from 1666 to 1669, when he returned to Cape of Good Hope
Jacob Jansz. Coeman (born after 1676), Dutch painter of the 17th century
Jan Jansz Buesem (c.1600–1649), Dutch painter
Jacob Jansz van Velsen (1597–1656), Dutch painter
Jan Jansz de Jonge Stampioen (1610–1690), Dutch mathematician famous for his published work on spherical trigonometry
Jan Jansz. de Stomme (1615–1658), Dutch painter
Jan Jansz. Treck (1606–1652), Dutch still-life painter 
Jan Jansz van de Velde (1620–1662), Dutch painter
Jan Jansz. Weltevree (born 1595), Dutch sailor and probably the first Dutchman to visit Korea
Jan Janszoon de Heem (1650–1695), Dutch still-life painter
Job Janszoon van Meekeren (1611–1666), Dutch surgeon
Johannes Jansz. van Bronckhorst (1627–1656), Dutch painter
Laurens Janszoon Coster (1370–1440), Dutch potential inventor of the printing press
Lenaert Jansz de Graeff (1530–1578), son of Jan Pietersz Graeff, a rich cloth merchant from Amsterdam
Lucas Janszoon Waghenaer (1533–1606), Dutch chief officer and cartographer
Matthias Jansz van Geuns (1758–1839), Dutch Mennonite teacher and minister
Michiel Jansz van Middelhoven (1562–1638), Dutch theologian
Michiel Jansz. van Mierevelt, (1567–1641), Dutch painter
Pieter Jansz (1612–1672), Dutch painter
Pieter Jansz van Asch (1603–1678), Dutch painter
Pieter Jansz van Ruyven (1651–1719), Dutch painter
Pieter Jansz. Saenredam (1597–1665), Dutch painter
Quirijn Jansz Damast (1580–1638), was a Dutch linen weaver and mayor of Haarlem
Salomon Jansz van den Tempel (1633–1673), Dutch master shipbuilder
Vechter Jansz van Teffelen (1563–1619), Dutch malt maker and mayor of Haarlem
Vincent Jansz van der Vinne (1736–1811), Dutch painter

See also 
 Janszoon voyage of 1605–06 – first recorded European landing on the Australian continent in 1606
 Project Laurens Janszoon Coster, collection of Dutch high literature on the web

References

Dutch-language surnames
Patronymic surnames